The 2021 Italian by-elections were held to replace members of the Italian Parliament. The elections were held on 3–4 October 2021.

List

Chamber of Deputies

Tuscany 12: Siena 

An election was held in the constituency of Siena, Tuscany to replace Pier Carlo Padoan (Democratic Party), who resigned in October 2020. Padoan was included in the board of directors of the Italian bank Unicredit, and therefore left his post in the Chamber of Deputies due to possible conflicts of interest.

Initially expected by March 31, 2021, the elections were postponed to October 3 and 4 of the same year, due to the COVID-19 pandemic in Italy.

In May 2021, the centre-right coalition nominated Tommaso Marrocchesi Marzi, a wine entrepreneur from Siena, as its candidate.

The Democratic Party (PD) nominated party Secretary and former Prime Minister Enrico Letta, who had not been a member of Parliament since 2015.

Lazio 1, 11: Rome (Primavalle) 

An election was held in the constituency of Rome Primavalle in Lazio to replace Emanuela Del Re (Five Star Movement). In June 2021, she was appointed EU Special Representative for Sahel by the Foreign Affairs Council, and therefore she left her post in the Italian Parliament.

The Five Star Movement (M5S) proposed the nomination of its leader and former Prime Minister Giuseppe Conte, who later rejected the proposal.

References

See also 
 By-elections in Italy

By-elections in Italy
2021 elections in Italy
October 2021 events in Italy